The George Romey House, also known as the Bruce Girton House, is a historic building located in Mason City, Iowa, United States.  George A. Romey was a local realtor who worked in partnership with William L. Patton.  He had Fred Lippert design this Prairie School house, which was built by J.M. Felt & Company in 1920.  Bruce Girton, the later owner, operated the family feed business.  The two-story brick house features wide eaves, broad hip roof, and groups of casement windows.  It was listed on the National Register of Historic Places in 1980.

References

Houses completed in 1920
Prairie School architecture in Iowa
Houses in Mason City, Iowa
National Register of Historic Places in Mason City, Iowa
Houses on the National Register of Historic Places in Iowa